The Fraunhofer Institute for Applied Optics and Precision Engineering (IOF), also referred to as the Fraunhofer IOF, is an institute of the Fraunhofer Society for the Advancement of Applied Research (FHG). The institute is based in Jena. Its activities are attributed to applied research and development in the branch of natural sciences in the field of optics and precision engineering. The institute was founded in 1992.

Research and development 

Building upon the experience of the Jena region in the field of surface and thin film technologies for optics, the Fraunhofer IOF conducts research and development in the area of optical systems aiming at enhancing the control of light – from its generation and manipulation to its actual use. The combination of competences in the areas of optics and precision engineering is particularly important.

The focuses also result in the department structure:

 Opto-mechanical System Design
 Micro and Nano-structured Optics
 Opto-mechatronical Components and Systems
 Precision Optical Components and Systems
 Functional Optical Surfaces and Layers
 Laser- and Fiber Technology
 Imaging and Sensing
 Emerging Technologies
 see also: thin film technology, surface physics, microstructure technology, nanotechnology, micro-optics, measurement technology, quantum technology

CMN-Optics 

In July 2006, the Fraunhofer IOF opened the Center for Advanced Micro- and Nano-Optics (CMN-Optics). The core of the facility is the SB350-OS electron beam lithography system. This device, also known as an "electron beam recorder", allows minimal structure sizes in the range of 50 nm with a high accuracy on substrate sizes up to 300 mm. The center is operated jointly with the Institute for Applied Physics (IAP) of the Friedrich Schiller University of Jena. The facility is also used by the Institute for Photonic Technologies (IPHT), Jena. The facility cost twelve million euros and was financed by the European Union, the Free State of Thuringia and the Fraunhofer Society.

Cooperations 

In 2003, the Fraunhofer Society concluded a cooperation agreement with the Friedrich Schiller University of Jena. It is the basis for collaboration between Fraunhofer IOF staff and the staff of the Institute of Applied Physics at the University of Jena. The aim of the cooperation is to provide practical training for the students, to improve the implementation of research results into practice and to share the high-quality equipment and infrastructures of both institutions.

Infrastructure 

At the end of 2020, Fraunhofer IOF had almost 330 employees, most of whom are scientists and technicians.

The operating budget for the Fraunhofer IOF was EUR 51,5 million in the 2020 financial year.

The Fraunhofer IOF has been headed by Andreas Tünnermann since 2003, who is also Director of the Institute of Applied Physics at the Friedrich Schiller University in Jena.

The institute has excellently equipped laboratories on an area of 3830 m² plus 1115 m² clean room (ISO class 1 - ISO class 7), a mechanics workshop meeting the highest demands as well as a test field for extensive testing and demonstration purposes. 

In the years 2002 and 2013 expansion facilities were built on the Beutenberg Campus in Jena.

In 2017 a fiber technology center was inaugurated at Fraunhofer IOF, which includes new special laboratories for the production of active and passive micro- and nanostructured optical fibers and one of the world's most powerful fiber drawing towers.

Awards 

 German Future Prize 2007

In cooperation with the semi-conductor manufacturer company Osram Opto Semiconductors from Regensburg, researchers from the Fraunhofer Institute in Jena, headed by Andreas Bräuer, received the German Future Prize worth EUR 250,000 on December 6. Their innovation consisted of improved chips, packages and a special optical system that enable more powerful light-emitting diodes.
    
 German Future Prize 2013

Stefan Nolte from the Fraunhofer Institute for Applied Optics and Precision Engineering (IOF) and Friedrich Schiller University Jena were together with Jens König (Robert Bosch GmbH) and Dirk Sutter (Trumpf Lasers) awarded for their work with ultra-short pulse lasers on December 4, 2013. 

 German Future Prize 2020

For their project "EUV Lithography - New Light for the Digital Age", the team of experts led by Sergiy Yulin (Fraunhofer IOF), Peter Kürz (ZEISS Semiconductor Manufacturing Technology (SMT) division), and Michael Kösters (TRUMPF Lasersystems for Semiconductor Manufacturing) was awarded the prize for technology and innovation.

References

External links 
 Fraunhofer Institute for Applied Optics and Precision Engineering (IOF) - Official website

1992 establishments in Germany
Engineering research institutes
Fraunhofer Society
Laboratories in Germany
Organizations established in 1992
Robotics organizations